The symbols of Portugal are official and unofficial flags, icons or cultural expressions that are emblematic, representative or otherwise characteristic of Portugal and of its culture.

Vexillology

Heraldry

Anthems

A Portuguesa (The Portuguese) is the national anthem of Portugal.

It was composed by Alfredo Keil and written by Henrique Lopes de Mendonça during the resurgent nationalist movement ignited by the 1890 British Ultimatum to Portugal concerning its African colonies. Used as the marching song of the failed republican rebellion of January 1891, in Porto, it was adopted as the national anthem of the newborn Portuguese Republic in 1911, replacing the Hino da Carta (Charter Anthem) which was the Portuguese national anthem during the period of the deposed constitutional monarchy. The Hino da Carta had in turn replaced in 1834, the Hino Patriótico (Patriotic Anthem), used until then as a semi-official national anthem.

The current official version of the A Portuguesa was approved by the Portuguese Council of Ministers in 16 July 1957.

The A Portuguesa was constitutionally confirmed as a national symbol in the Portuguese Constitution of 1976.

Portugal has also a secondary official anthem, which is the Maria da Fonte anthem. This anthem is used in certain occasions - during military and civic ceremonies - when the A Portuguesa does not apply, namely, serving as honors music to the Speaker of the Parliament, the Prime Minister and Cabinet, the President of the Supreme Court of Justice and the military heads of the Armed Forces, Navy, Army and Air Force.

Cultural

 Belém Tower is a fortified tower located in the civil parish of Belém in Lisbon. The tower was built in the early 16th century and is a prominent example of the Portuguese Manueline style. By its characteristics, is one of the most distinctive monuments of the world and thus considered an icon of Portugal.
Os Lusíadas is an epic poem written by Camões in the 16th century. It is regarded as Portugal's national epic.
 Fado (destiny, fate) is a mainly melancholic music genre which can be traced to the 1820s in Portugal, but probably with much earlier origins. There are two main varieties: the Lisbon fado and the Coimbra fado. It is considered the national music genre of Portugal, with Amália Rodrigues (1920-1999) its "queen".
 The Calçada portuguesa (Portuguese pavement) is a traditional style pavement used for many pedestrian areas in Portugal, while it can also be found throughout former Portuguese colonies such as Brazil and Macau.

Flora and fauna

 The Quercus suber, commonly called the cork oak, is a medium-sized, evergreen oak tree in the section Quercus sect. Cerris. Traditionally, it is the primary source of cork for wine bottle stoppers, as well as for other uses, such as cork flooring. Cork is now used in a number of untraditional applications like shoes, cloths, fashion accessories, construction, sports equipment and even in space ships components. The quercus suber holds great importance in the economy of Portugal, especially the southern regions, the country being the largest producer of cork.  In December 2011, after a petition signed by thousands of citizens, the Quercus suber was declared the national tree by the Portuguese Parliament. 
 The Galo de Barcelos (Rooster of Barcelos) is one of the most common emblems of Portugal. These pieces of craftsmanship, made in painted clay in the city of Barcelos celebrate an old legend that tells the story of a dead rooster's miraculous intervention in proving the innocence of a man who had been falsely accused and sentenced to death. 
The wyvern was used as the crest of the Royal Arms of Portugal since the 15th century. Later, two dragons were also used as supports of the Arms of Portugal. Until the 17th century, the dragon was represented in gold, but from then on it became usually represented in green, probably because green was the national color of the Kingdom during the early reigning of the House of Braganza. Presently, among the common Portuguese, the dragon is usually associated as the mascot of the FC Porto football club, due to the fact that the emblem of this club includes the old coat of arms of the city of Porto, which had the Royal dragon as a crest, granted to it as an augmentation of honor in 1837.

Food and drink

A pastel de nata is a Portuguese egg tart pastry, very popular in Portugal and the Lusosphere.
The bacalhau (cod fish) is one of Portugal's most recognisable and traditional foods. There are said to be over 1000 recipes of bacalhau in Portugal. 
 Port wine is a Portuguese fortified wine produced exclusively in the Douro Valley in the northern provinces of Portugal. It is typically a sweet, red wine, often served as a dessert wine though it also comes in dry, semi-dry, and white varieties.

People

 Efígie da República is used as a national personification in Portugal, symbolizing the Republic.
 Luís de Camões is considered Portugal's and the Portuguese language's greatest poet. His date of death (10 June) is celebrated as Portugal Day. 
 Zé Povinho is a Portuguese everyman created in 1875 by Rafael Bordalo Pinheiro. He became first a symbol of the Portuguese working-class people, and eventually into the unofficial personification of Portugal.

See also 
 List of cultural icons of Portugal
 List of national monuments of Portugal

References

 
Portuguese culture